The Philadelphia Barrage were a field lacrosse team that are based in Philadelphia, Pennsylvania, and member of Major League Lacrosse. They were the Bridgeport Barrage from 2001 to 2003 at The Ballpark at Harbor Yard in Bridgeport, Connecticut. The team then relocated to Philadelphia from the 2004 season to the 2007 season when they became a traveling team for 2008.  They ceased operations before the 2009 season due to the economic situation in the United States. The Philadelphia Barrage were resurrected for the 2020 season.

Franchise history

The team played in Bridgeport, Connecticut from the 2001 to the 2003 season and relocated to the Philadelphia suburb of Villanova in 2004. From their initial move to Philadelphia, for the 2004 season, through the 2006 season, they played at Villanova Stadium, which is located on the campus of Villanova University. They had previously played at The Ballpark at Harbor Yard in Bridgeport where they hosted the inaugural Major League Lacrosse All Star Game in 2001. The Barrage made the playoffs for the first time in 2004 and won the Major League Lacrosse Championship over the Boston Cannons.  The Barrage, after winning their 1st Eastern Conference Title, once again made the playoffs and won the Major League Lacrosse Championship in 2006 over the Denver Outlaws. For the 2007 season, the team moved to the United Sports Training Center in West Bradford Township, Pennsylvania.  The Barrage, after winning their 2nd Eastern Conference Title, once again made the playoffs and won the Major League Lacrosse Championship in 2007 over the Los Angeles Riptide.  The Barrage become the first team in MLL History to win back to back Steinfield Cup titles by winning the championship in 2006 and 2007.

After subsequent months of rumors, about the status and financial health of the franchise in 2007, Major League Lacrosse assumed operational control of the franchise in 2008. The Barrage played the full 2008 season as a travel team with their designated home games at league promotional sites outside of the Philadelphia area. The team folded before the 2009 season.

2020 to present: Rebirth
On February 17, 2020, MLL announced it was bringing back the Philadelphia Barrage after it folded the Atlanta Blaze the day before. The league named Blaze general manager Spencer Ford as the Barrage head coach. The team will operate under Mark Burdett, the league's Chief Revenue Officer.

The Barrage were not able to announce a new home venue before the COVID-19 pandemic affected the 2020 season, delaying their official return to Philadelphia until 2021. The team played its first game on July 18 in a quarantined Navy-Marine Corps Memorial Stadium against the Chesapeake Bayhawks. Despite getting out to a 3–0 lead, the team lost in its first game since 2008 by a score of 16–11 to the Bayhawks. On July 20, in third try, the Barrage won their first game since 2008, by a 14–10 score over the new Connecticut Hammerheads. With a 12-11 comeback win in their last game against the New York Lizards, the Barrage finished their comeback season 2–3, which was not good enough for a playoff berth.

Roster 

(C)- captain

(A)- alternate captain

Season-by-season

Game-by-game
2001 Bridgeport Barrage season
2002 Bridgeport Barrage season
2003 Bridgeport Barrage season
2004 Philadelphia Barrage season
2005 Philadelphia Barrage season
2006 Philadelphia Barrage season
2007 Philadelphia Barrage season
2008 Philadelphia Barrage season

Coaches and others
 Ted Garber 2001 (3–11)
 Sal LoCascio 2002–2004 (11–27)
 Tony Resch 2005–2008 (30–18)
 Ken Paul 2001–2002 (general manager)
 Trey Reeder 2003–2004 (general manager)
 Keith Mecca 2005–2007 (general manager)
 Spencer Ford 2020-Present (1-3)

References

See also
Lacrosse in Pennsylvania

 
Defunct sports teams in Philadelphia
Lacrosse teams in Pennsylvania
Defunct Major League Lacrosse teams
Lacrosse clubs established in 2004
Lacrosse clubs disestablished in 2008
2004 establishments in Connecticut
2008 disestablishments in Pennsylvania